Sanguisorba is a genus of flowering plants in the family Rosaceae native to the temperate regions of the Northern Hemisphere. The common name is burnet.

Description
The plants are herbaceous perennials or small shrubs. The stems grow to 50–200 cm tall and have a cluster of basal leaves, with further leaves arranged alternately up the stem. The leaves are pinnate, 5–30 cm long, with 7-25 leaflets, the leaflets with a serrated margin. Young leaves grow from the crown in the center of the plant. The flowers are small, produced in dense clusters 5–20 mm long; each flower has four very small petals, white to red in colour.

Species
The following species are accepted:
Sanguisorba albanica András. & Jáv.
Sanguisorba albiflora (Makino) Makino
Sanguisorba alpina Bunge
Sanguisorba ancistroides (Desf.) Ces.
Sanguisorba annua (Nutt. ex Hook.) Torr. & A.Gray – annual burnet, prairie burnet, western burnet
Sanguisorba applanata T.T.Yu & C.L.Li
Sanguisorba armena Boiss.
Sanguisorba azovtsevii Krasnob. & Pshenich.
Sanguisorba canadensis L. – Canadian burnet, white burnet
Sanguisorba cretica Hayek
Sanguisorba diandra (Hook.f.) Nordborg
Sanguisorba dodecandra Moretti – Italian burnet
Sanguisorba durui Yild.
Sanguisorba filiformis (Hook.f.) Hand.-Mazz.
Sanguisorba hakusanensis Makino
Sanguisorba hybrida (L.) Font Quer
Sanguisorba indica (Gardner) Tirveng.
Sanguisorba japonensis (Makino) Kudô
Sanguisorba × kishinamii Honda
Sanguisorba lateriflora (Coss.) A.Braun & C.D.Bouché
Sanguisorba longifolia Bertol.
Sanguisorba magnifica I.Schischk. & Kom.
Sanguisorba mauritanica Desf.
Sanguisorba megacarpa (Lowe) Muñoz Garm. & C.Navarro
Sanguisorba menendezii (Svent.) Nordborg – Canary Islands burnet
Sanguisorba minor Scop. – salad burnet, garden burnet, little burnet
Sanguisorba obtusa Maxim. – Japanese burnet
Sanguisorba occidentalis Nutt.
Sanguisorba officinalis L. – great burnet, burnet bloodwort
Sanguisorba × poroshirensis S.Watan.
Sanguisorba × pseudo-officinalis Naruh.
Sanguisorba riparia Juz.
Sanguisorba rupicola (Boiss. & Reut.) A.Braun & C.D.Bouché
Sanguisorba sirnakia Yild.
Sanguisorba stipulata Raf.
Sanguisorba × takahashihideoi Naruh.
Sanguisorba tenuifolia Fisch. ex Link

Ecology
Sanguisorba minor is a food plant for the larvae of the grizzled skipper (Pyrgus malvae) and the mouse moth (Amphipyra tragopoginis).

Cultivation and uses
Burnets are cultivated as garden plants. Many cultivars have been bred, especially from S. officinalis. S. canadensis is grown for its white flowers on stems that well exceed a meter tall. The plants hybridize easily, producing new mixes. S. obtusa is valued for its foliage of pink-edged, gray-green leaves.

Sanguisorba officinalis is used in traditional Chinese medicinal to treat gastrointestinal conditions and bleeding.

Sanguisorba minor, salad burnet, has similarly been used medicinally in Europe to control bleeding. The leaves have a cucumber flavour and can be eaten in salads, or used fresh or dried and made into a tea.

Etymology
The Latin genus name Sanguisorba means ‘blood stauncher’. ‘Sanguis’ is a cognate with ‘sanguine’, meaning 'blood'. ‘Sorbeo’ means 'to staunch’. The plant is known to have styptic properties.

References

 
Rosaceae genera